Prom Wars is a 2008 Canadian teen comedy film directed by Phil Price and starring Raviv Ullman, Alia Shawkat, Rachelle Lefèvre, and Kevin Coughlin.

Premise
The graduating class at Miss Aversham and Miss Cronstall's School for Girls find that they have – in defiance of the natural laws of probability – all blossomed simultaneously. Capitalizing on their unique status, and intent on teaching high school boys to never take girls for granted, they issue a challenge to the boys of Easthill's rival private schools, Selby and Lancaster. The winner in a series of designated competitions will be awarded exclusive rights to the girls as prom dates. Like the capricious and meddlesome gods of Greek mythology, the ACS girls pit the boys' schools against each other in a (secret) Prom War.

Cast
 Raviv Ullman as Percy Collins
 Alia Shawkat as Diana Riggs
 Rachelle Lefèvre as Sabina
 Nicolas Wright as Joseph
 Kevin Coughlin as Geoffrey
 Chad Connell as Rupert
 Jesse Rath as Francis
 Yann Bernaquez as Hamish
 Cory Hogan as Jasper
 Noah Bernett as Kyle
 Alexandra Cohen as Maggie
 Meaghan Rath as Jen L.
 Mélanie St-Pierre as Jen Bergman
 Daniel Rindress-Kay as Northrop
 Keenan MacWilliam as Meg

References

External links
 

2008 films
2008 comedy films
2000s teen comedy films
Canadian teen comedy films
English-language Canadian films
Films about proms
Films shot in Montreal
2000s English-language films
2000s Canadian films